Lorain Assembly was a Ford Motor Company factory in Lorain, Ohio.  The plant opened in 1958 and closed in 2005, having produced approximately 8,000,000 vehicles under 13 model names. Production of the plant's final product, the E-Series, moved to Ohio Assembly in Avon Lake.

Products:
 1958–1959 Ford Galaxie
 1958–1965 Ford F-Series
 1958–1979 Ford Ranchero
 1960–1967 Ford Falcon/Mercury Comet
 1961–2005 Ford Econoline
 1964–1971 Mercury Cyclone
 1966–1970 Ford Fairlane
 1968–1976 Mercury Montego
 1971–1976 Ford Torino / Gran Torino
 1974–1976 Ford Elite
 1977–1979 Ford LTD II
 1977–1997 Mercury Cougar
 1980–1997 Ford Thunderbird

Sources
 

Ford factories
Former motor vehicle assembly plants
Motor vehicle assembly plants in Ohio
Buildings and structures in Lorain, Ohio